Jaime is a common Spanish and Portuguese male given name for Jacob (name), James (name), Jamie, or Jacques. In Occitania Jacobus became Jacome and later Jacme. In east Spain, Jacme became Jaime, in Aragon it became Chaime, and in Catalonia it became Jaume. In western Spain Jacobus became Iago; in Portugal it became Tiago. The name Saint James developed in Spanish to Santiago, in Portuguese to São Tiago. The names Diego (Spanish) and Diogo (Portuguese) are also Iberian versions of Jaime.

In the United States, Jaime is used as an independent masculine given name, along with given name James.

For females, it remains less popular, not appearing on the top 1,000 U.S. female names for the past 5 years.

People 
 Jaime, Duke of Braganza, Portuguese nobleman of the 15th/16th centuries, the 4th Duke of Braganza
 Infante Jaime, Duke of Segovia (1908–1975), Spanish prince, the second son of Alfonso XIII of Spain and his wife Victoria Eugenie of Battenberg
 Jaime Angelopoulos (born 1982), Canadian sculptor
 Jaime Areizaga-Soto, attorney
 Jaime Augusto Zobel de Ayala (born 1959), Filipino chairman and CEO of the Ayala Corporation
 Jaime Barría (born 1996), Panamanian baseball player
 Jaime Bosch, several
 Jaime Botín (born 1936), Spanish billionaire heir and banker
 Jaime Camara (born 1980), Brazilian racing driver
 Jaime Camil (born 1973), actor
 Jaime Carbonell, computer scientist at Carnegie Mellon University
 Jaime Castillo, several
 Jaime Churches (born 1988), American politician
 Jaime Clarke (born 1971), American novelist and editor
 Jaime Córdoba (born 1988), Colombian footballer
 Jaime Córdoba (politician) (born 1950), Curaçaoan politician
 Jaime Escalante, Bolivian-American educator and subject of the film Stand and Deliver
 , Spanish designer and artist and founder of Hayon Studio
 Jaime Hernandez, American cartoonist and co-creator of the comic book series Love and Rockets
 Jaime Eyzaguirre (1908–1968), Chilean lawyer and historian
 Jaime Gutiérrez Avendaño (1936–2012), Salvadoran military officer and politician
 Jaime Guzmán (1946–1991), Chilean lawyer and politician
 Jaime Hipp, American water polo goalkeeper
 Jaime Huélamo (1948–2014), Spanish road cyclist
 Jaime Jaquez Jr. (born 2001), American basketball player
 Jaime Jiménez Merlo (born 1980), Spanish football (soccer) player commonly known as Jaime
 Jaime King (born 1979), American actress and model
 Jaime King (swimmer) (born 1976), English Olympic swimmer
 Jaime Laredo (born 1941), Bolivian-American director and violist
 Jaime Luis Gómez, better known as Taboo, a member of The Black Eyed Peas
 Jaime de Marichalar (born 1963), former Spanish royalty
 Jaime Maussan (born 1953), Mexican journalist
 Jaime Meline, aka El-P, hip-hop artist
 Jaime Melo (born 1980), Brazilian racing driver
 Jaime Moreno (born 1974), Bolivian football (soccer) player
 Jaime Murray (born 1976), British actress
 Jaime Ray Newman (born 1978), American actress and singer
 Jaime Nunó (1824–1908), Spanish composer
 Jaime Pressly (born 1977), American actress
 Jaime Patricio Ramírez (born 1967), Chilean football (soccer) player
 Jaime Preciado, bassist of the rock band Pierce the Veil
Jaime Queralt-Lortzing Beckmann, Spanish rally driver (winner Rally España Histórico 2009)
 Jaime Sánchez Fernández (born 1973), Spanish footballer
 Jaime Sin, Filipino Catholic cardinal who took part in the People Power Revolution
 Jaime Vera (born 1963), Chilean football (soccer) player
 Jaime Yzaga (born 1967), Peruvian tennis player
 Jaime Zobel de Ayala (born 1934), Filipino businessman and chairman emeritus of Ayala Corporation
 Jaime Augusto Zobel de Ayala (born 1959), Filipino businessman, son of Jaime, and current chairman and CEO of Ayala Corporation

Characters 
 Jaime Lannister, known as "Kingslayer", a fictional character in the fantasy epic novel series A Song of Ice and Fire and its derived works such as TV series Game of Thrones. However, this is likely not derived from the Spanish name "Jaime" but is instead a corrupted spelling of "Jamie", which is how the name in the series is pronounced. It is common in the book series for characters' names to be slight misspellings of real-life English names.
 Jaime Reyes (comics), a DC Comics superhero known as Blue Beetle
 Jaime Rosales, a character in Cassandra Clare's Lady Midnight
 Jaime Sommers (The Bionic Woman), the title character of The Bionic Woman
 Jaime Castro, a character in the television series Broad City

See also 
 Jaime (1974 film), a Portuguese film directed by António Reis
 Jaime (1999 film), a 1999 Portuguese film
 Domingo Romeo Jaime, one of the pioneers of Cuban Scouting
Jaime (album), a 2019 album from Brittany Howard
 Jaimes
 Jaimie
 James (name)
 Jamie

References 

Portuguese masculine given names
Spanish masculine given names
English masculine given names
English feminine given names
English unisex given names